William Henry Ward on 30 April 1872 was granted a USA patent for "Improvement for collecting electricity for telegraphing". He theorized that an "electrical layer in the atmosphere" could carry signals like a telegraph wire, and thus is sometimes listed among supposed inventors of radio.

See also
 Mahlon Loomis

External links
http://www.npr.org/euonline/members/feature/inventors/references.htm
Fakes, Frauds, and Cranks (1866-1922) (earlyradiohistory.us)

American inventors
Year of death missing
Year of birth missing